Annette Chaparro (born October 8, 1967) is an American Democratic Party politician who has represented the 33rd Legislative District in the New Jersey General Assembly since she was sworn into office on January 12, 2016. Chapparo has served in the Assembly as Deputy Speaker Pro Tempore since 2022.
 
A resident of Hoboken, New Jersey, Chaparro graduated from Hoboken High School and works as a clerk for the City of Hoboken.

New Jersey Assembly 
After the local Democratic Party decided to keep Assemblyman Carmelo Garcia off the primary ballot, a deal was reached in March 2015 between Senator Brian P. Stack, who is the mayor of Union City, and Hoboken Mayor Dawn Zimmer to nominate Chaparro to replace Garcia on the ballot.

Legislation 
In the 2018-2019 legislative session, Chaparro was primary sponsor on the following bills signed into law:

 A-1428 Requires Department of Education to develop guidelines for school districts concerning child trafficking awareness and prevention.
 A-5002 Permits certain planned real estate developments to file certain liens; concerns limited priority of certain liens.
 AJR-122 Designates September 20 of each year as Hispanic Journalist Pride Day.

Committees 
Committee assignments for the current session are:
Law and Public Safety, Vice-Chair
Tourism, Gaming and the Arts, Vice-Chair
Budget

District 33 
Each of the 40 districts in the New Jersey Legislature has one representative in the New Jersey Senate and two members in the New Jersey General Assembly. The representatives from the 33rd District for the 2022—23 Legislative Session are:
 Senator Brian P. Stack  (D)
 Assemblywoman Annette Chaparro  (D)
 Assemblyman Raj Mukherji  (D)

References

External links
Assemblywoman Chaparro's legislative web page, New Jersey Legislature
Assemblywoman Chaparro's Assembly Democrats web page
New Jersey Legislature financial disclosure forms
2018 2017 2016 2015

1967 births
Living people
Hoboken High School alumni
Democratic Party members of the New Jersey General Assembly
Politicians from Hoboken, New Jersey
Women state legislators in New Jersey
21st-century American politicians
21st-century American women politicians